Trinity Episcopal Church is a historic Episcopal church located in Parkersburg, Wood County, West Virginia. Records indicate that Episcopal services were conducted as early as 1815 by itinerant clergymen, but there was not a building so services were conducted in the county court.  In 1843, the Rt. Rev. Wm. Meade, Bishop of Virginia, sent the Rev. Tho. Smith to be the vicar of a small congregation.  The church property was given by John Snodgrass, a member of congress from this district.  The first church's building began in 1846, and Rev. Smith died at age 48, before its completion.  He was buried, by his request, under the front steps.  He felt he was "a poor sinner and wanted to be trampled under the feet of all who entered."  The first church was completed in 1850, with the rectory built in 1863, and occupied until 1919, when it was turned into office buildings and Sunday school rooms.  The old church was torn down in 1878, and the present building completed and consecrated in 1879.  The church's foundation stones come from Quincy Hill quarry.  In 1913, the church was flooded and pews were taken up and stored higher, but the organ, furnaces and floor was destroyed.  Another flood occurred in 1937, however, this one was not as severe, yet the pews were replaced.

Trinity Hall was built in 1881, financed by children via plays and bake sales, with the cost totaling $750.

It was listed on the National Register of Historic Places in 1982.

Trinity Episcopal Church is locally renowned for the annual used book sale held each fall by its ECW (Episcopal Church Women). They are also well known for their Monday feeding ministry where they feed between 120 and 170 meals each Monday between 11:00 AM and noon.

References

External links

Buildings and structures in Parkersburg, West Virginia
Churches on the National Register of Historic Places in West Virginia
Episcopal churches in West Virginia
Gothic Revival church buildings in West Virginia
Churches completed in 1878
Churches in Wood County, West Virginia
National Register of Historic Places in Wood County, West Virginia
19th-century Episcopal church buildings